U.K. Murali is an Indian singer and music composer.

Career
UK Murali is an exclusive singer who has sung for 16 hours non-stop in 25 different voices at Kamarajar Arangam Chennai. according to an article of 26 October 2005 from the Dina Thandi newspaper.

For the first time ever three music directors Shankar–Ganesh, Deva, A. R. Reihana singing a song together for another music composer U.K.Murali for the film Win.

Discography
 2017 – Ayyanar Veethi

References

External links
 Behindwoods.com

Living people
Indian male singers
Indian film score composers
Musicians from Chennai
Indian male film score composers
Year of birth missing (living people)